Jürgen Hildebrand (born 24 July 1948) is an East German former handball player who competed in the 1972 Summer Olympics.

He was born in Halle an der Saale. In 1972 he was part of the East German team which finished fourth in the Olympic tournament. He played all six matches and scored one goal. He played for the SC Dynamo Berlin / Sportvereinigung (SV) Dynamo. He won the silver medal at the world championships, 1974.

References 

profile

1948 births
Living people
German male handball players
Olympic handball players of East Germany
Handball players at the 1972 Summer Olympics